Sud Nivernais Imphy Decize (SNID) is the name of a French football club from the south of the Nièvre. The manager, Jean-Philippe Panier is leading them in the CFA2.

The club was created in 2003 as a merger between Sporting Club Imphy (founded in 1925) and Association Sportive Decizoise (founded in 1932). The club has notably employed the services of Reynald Pedros, who previously played in Ligue 1, for clubs such as Nantes and Bastia. 
Other former professionals who played for the club in 2006/2007 include: Xavier Méride (ex-RC Lens and Toulouse FC) and Senegalese attacker Gaston Diamé (former Ligue 2 with Stade de Reims).

Honours 

Winners of the coupe de la Nièvre 2006,2007
Champion of DH Bourgogne 2004

External links 
 Blog
 Official site

Sport in Nièvre
Association football clubs established in 2003
2003 establishments in France
Football clubs in Bourgogne-Franche-Comté